Rifal Lastori (born 9 June 1997), is an Indonesian professional footballer who plays as a winger for Liga 2 club PSIM Yogyakarta, on loan from Liga 1 club Borneo.

Career statistics

Club

Honours

Club 
PSIS Semarang
 Liga 2 third place (play-offs): 2017
PSS Sleman
 Liga 2: 2018
RANS Cilegon
 Liga 2 runner-up: 2021

Individual 
 Liga 2 Best Player: 2021
 Liga 2 Best XI: 2021

References

External links 
 Rifal Lastori at Soccerway
 Rifal Lastori at Liga Indonesia

1997 births
Living people
Indonesian Muslims
Indonesian footballers
Borneo F.C. players
PSIS Semarang players
PSS Sleman players
RANS Nusantara F.C. players
PSIM Yogyakarta players
Liga 2 (Indonesia) players
Liga 1 (Indonesia) players
Indonesia youth international footballers
Association football wingers
Sportspeople from North Maluku